FC Rotor-2 Volgograd is a Russian football team based in Volgograd. It is the farm club for FC Rotor Volgograd. It previously played professionally as FC Rotor-d Volgograd or FC Rotor-2 Volgograd in the Russian Second Division in 1992–1993, 1998–2000 and 2004 and Russian Third League in 1994-1997. They came in 3rd place in their Second Division zone in 1993. In 2001, the reserves tournament for Russian Premier League was re-established and the reserves team played there while the main team stayed in Premier League.

In 2005, the main Rotor team played under the name of FC Rotor-2 Volgograd, as the parent club had lost their professional licence. Subsequently, Rotor-2 was renamed Rotor, and a Rotor reserve side entered the Volgograd Oblast Championship. Following Rotor's promotion to the second-tier Russian National Football League for the 2017–18 season, the reserve team received professional license for the third-tier Russian Professional Football League. Following Rotor's promotion to Russian Premier League for the 2020–21 season, Rotor-2 left PFL as RPL conducts their own Under-20 league for reserve teams. Rotor was relegated after one season at the top level, and Rotor-2 re-entered PFL for the 2021–22 season. The parent club was itself relegated once again, to the third-tier FNL 2 at the end of the 2021–22 season, making Rotor-2 ineligible to play in the same league.

References

External links
  Official club page 

Association football clubs established in 1992
Football clubs in Russia
Sport in Volgograd
1992 establishments in Russia
FC Rotor Volgograd